WLML-FM (100.3 FM, "Legends 100.3") is an adult standards radio station licensed to serve Lake Park, Florida, serving West Palm Beach, Florida. Artists include Frank Sinatra, Michael Bublé, Dean Martin, Ella Fitzgerald and Diana Krall. Co-owner Dick Robinson, who is a nighttime host, started the Connecticut School of Broadcasting and hosts a syndicated standards program. Robinson also started the Society For The Preservation of the Great American Songbook. Afternoon DJ Lorna O'Connell is a veteran of the West Palm Beach radio market.

References

External links
Station website

LML
Radio stations established in 2014
2014 establishments in Florida